Four ships of the U.S. Navy have been named USS Maryland:
 , a sloop during the Napoleonic Wars
 , a Pennsylvania-class cruiser, saw action in World War I, later renamed USS Frederick
 , a Colorado-class battleship known as "Fighting Mary," saw action in World War II
 , an Ohio-class ballistic missile submarine, commissioned in 1992, currently in active service

United States Navy ship names